The Belle of New York  is a 1952 Metro-Goldwyn-Mayer Hollywood musical comedy film set in New York City circa 1900 and stars Fred Astaire, Vera-Ellen, Alice Pearce, Marjorie Main, Gale Robbins, and Keenan Wynn, with music by Harry Warren and lyrics by Johnny Mercer. The film was directed by Charles Walters.

This whimsical (even by Astaire's standards) musical failed at the box office and impressed few critics at the time, mainly due to the nature of the plot which empowers lovers to float free of the influence of gravity - a conceit reprised in the 1999 film Simply Irresistible. Astaire was reluctant to take the project - he was originally supposed to play the role in 1946 but had avoided it through retirement. Clearly stung by its failure, Astaire later claimed that the dance routines - of which there are more than usual - are of a particularly high standard - a rare verdict from such a notoriously self-critical artist. Vera-Ellen is generally viewed as one of Astaire's most technically proficient dance partners, and this was a factor in his readiness to expand the dance content of the film beyond its traditional proportions.

Plot
Set in turn-of-the-century New York, wealthy playboy Charles Hill (Fred Astaire) is causing difficulties for his guardian, Aunt Lettie (Marjorie Main) and lawyer, Max (Keenan Wynn). Prone to fall in love then ditching his showgirl brides-to-be at the altar, the compensation bills are mounting. After the most recent episode, he hears Angela (Vera-Ellen) leading a Salvation Army band in song. He falls in love at first sight and when she scoffs at him, telling him that if he were in love his feet would leave the ground, he promptly floats high into the air. He pursues her, even vowing to do an honest day's work for the first time in his life. After various attempts to convince her, Angela's feeling finally cause her feet to leave the ground. After a couple of misunderstandings are resolved, they float dancing into the air together, to a chorus of well-wishers below as the film ends.

Cast 
 Fred Astaire as Charlie Hill
 Vera-Ellen as Angela Bonfils
 Marjorie Main as Mrs. Phineas Hill
 Keenan Wynn as Max Ferris
 Alice Pearce as Elsie Wilkins
 Clinton Sundberg as Gilford Spivak
 Gale Robbins as Dixie 'Deadshot' McCoy

Production 

The film was in development since 1943. Producer Arthur Freed had asked Rodgers and Hammerstein to write the music.

It was then slated to be filmed in 1945 with Astaire and Judy Garland. Due to Garland’s busy schedule she dropped out.

Apparently Mae West was considered for the role of Mrs. Hill. However she was considered too expensive. Beatrice Lillie was also considered.

Musical numbers
The choreography makes play with ideas of lightness, of floating on air and on ice, and the use of platforms, with Astaire consciously avoiding his usual love of noise-making in his solos. Vera-Ellen's lithe and waif-like figure (she allegedly suffered from anorexia nervosa in real life) facilitated this concept. This also marks choreographer Robert Alton's last collaboration with Astaire.

 When I'm Out With The Belle of New York: The film's signature waltz is delivered by a male chorus outside Vera-Ellen's window.
 Who Wants To Kiss The Bridegroom: Astaire sings and dances with seven lovely women in sequence, finishing the routine on a table.
 Let A Little Love Come In: Sung by Alice Pearce and then by Vera-Ellen (dubbed here by Anita Ellis).
 Seeing's Believing: Astaire fantasy song-and-dance solo performed atop a mock-up of Washington Square Arch, making considerable use of process photography. Astaire's verdict was: "After much experimentation and testing, it neither came off photographically nor story-wise."
 Baby Doll: Partnered romantic duet, with gentle comic overtones, sung by Astaire and danced by Astaire and Vera-Ellen with much emphasis on twirling motifs and platform work.
 Oops: Comic dance duet, sung by Astaire, takes place in and around a moving horse-drawn streetcar which introduces the platform ingredient into a linear side-by-side style of choreography incorporating gags and tap routines which echo aspects of the I'm Putting All My Eggs In One Basket Astaire-Rogers number from Follow the Fleet.
 A Bride's Wedding Day Song (Currier And Ives): After some unfortunately cloying opening scenes, and an attractive swirling routine on an ice-skating rink, Astaire and Vera-Ellen launch into a duet which in terms of virtuosity is equalled only by the famous Waltz In Swing Time Astaire-Rogers dance from Swing Time, with which this routine has some elements in common, being also a syncopated waltz with tap components, this time to a speeded-up version of The Belle Of New York. The apparent ease with which Vera-Ellen copes with the myriad complexities of this routine has sealed her reputation as one of Astaire's most accomplished dance partners. Lastly, this dance is noteworthy for being Astaire's last full tap duet with a leading lady on film, as Ellen was the last of his dance partners who could tap.
 Naughty But Nice: A solo song (dubbed by Ellis) and dance routine by Vera-Ellen.
 I Wanna Be A Dancin' Man: Astaire's second solo routine is a song and sand-dance (only his second sand-dance on film, the other being the No Strings number in Top Hat), and one which - by running separate takes side by side in split screen - has been used in That's Entertainment, Part III to illustrate the extreme precision of Astaire's dance technique. The number - whose lyrics are a tribute to Astaire by his friend Mercer - is a humorous study in nonchalance, with Astaire's choreography deliberately offsetting Mercer's tribute.

Reception
According to MGM records the film earned $1,340,000 in the US and Canada and $642,000 elsewhere, resulting in a loss of $1,576,000.

References

External links
 
 

1952 films
1952 musical comedy films
Metro-Goldwyn-Mayer films
Films directed by Charles Walters
Films set in New York City
Films set in the 1900s
Films produced by Arthur Freed
American musical comedy films
1950s English-language films
1950s American films